The 2003–04 All-Ireland Senior Club Hurling Championship was the 34th staging of the All-Ireland Senior Club Hurling Championship, the Gaelic Athletic Association's premier inter-county hurling tournament for senior clubs. The championship began on 18 October 2003 and ended on 17 March 2004.

Birr were the defending champions but were defeated by O'Loughlin Gaels in the Leinster final.

On 17 March 2004, Newtownshandrum won the championship following a 0-17 to 1-6 defeat of Dunloy in the All-Ireland final. This was their first All-Ireland title.

Newtownshandrum's Ben O'Connor was the championship's top scorer with 0-47.

Pre-championship
The build-up to the opening of the championship was dominated by Birr and the possibility that they would become the first club to win three All-Ireland titles in-a-row, and a record-breaking fifth championship title over all.  Having secured their fifth successive county title, Birr were favourites to retain their provincial title for a third year-in-a-row.  This would leave them only two wins away from hurling immortality.

The championship

Participating counties

Fixtures

Connacht Senior Club Hurling Championship

Quarter-finals

Semi-final

Final

Leinster Senior Club Hurling Championship

First round

Quarter-finals

Semi-finals

Final

Munster Senior Club Hurling Championship

Quarter-finals

Semi-finals

Final

Ulster Senior Club Hurling Championship

Semi-finals

Final

All-Ireland Senior Club Hurling Championship

Quarter-final

Semi-finals

Final

Scoring statistics

Top scorers overall

Top scorers in a single game

References

2003 in hurling
2004 in hurling
All-Ireland Senior Club Hurling Championship